Abashevo is a rural locality (a village) in Blagoveschenskoye Rural Settlement of Bolsheselsky District, Yaroslavl Oblast, Russia. The population was 22 as of 2007.

Geography 
Abashevo is located 16 km north of Bolshoye Selo (the district's administrative centre) by road. Medvedevo is the nearest rural locality.

References 

Rural localities in Yaroslavl Oblast
Bolsheselsky District